Ammonium cyanide is an unstable inorganic compound with the formula NH4CN.

Uses
Ammonium cyanide is generally used in organic synthesis.  Being unstable, it is not shipped or sold commercially.

Preparation
Ammonium cyanide is prepared in solution by bubbling hydrogen cyanide into aqueous ammonia at a low temperature
 HCN + NH3 (aq) → NH4CN (aq)

It may be prepared by the reaction of calcium cyanide and ammonium carbonate:
 Ca(CN)2 + (NH4)2CO3 → 2 NH4CN + CaCO3

In dry state, ammonium cyanide is made by heating a mixture of potassium cyanide or potassium ferrocyanide with ammonium chloride and condensing the vapours into ammonium cyanide crystals:
 KCN + NH4Cl → NH4CN + KCl

Reactions
Ammonium cyanide decomposes to ammonia and hydrogen cyanide, often forming a black polymer of hydrogen cyanide:
 NH4CN → NH3 + HCN

It undergoes salt metathesis reaction in solution with a number of metal salts to form metal–cyanide complexes.

Reaction with ketones and aldehydes yield aminonitriles, as in the first step of the Strecker amino acid synthesis:
 NH4CN + CH3COCH3 → (CH3)2C(NH2)CN + H2O

Toxicity
The solid or its solution is highly toxic. Ingestion can cause death. Exposure to the solid can be harmful as it decomposes to highly toxic hydrogen cyanide and ammonia.

Chemical analysis
Ammonium cyanide may be analyzed by heating the salt and trapping the decomposed products: hydrogen cyanide and ammonia in water at low temperatures. The aqueous solution is analyzed for cyanide ion by silver nitrate titrimetric method or an ion-selective
electrode method, and ammonia is measured by titration or electrode technique.

Notes

References
 A. F. Wells, Structural Inorganic Chemistry, 5th ed., Oxford University Press, Oxford, UK, 1984.

Cyanides
Ammonium compounds